Colin Morgan (born 12 November 1973) is a Canadian judoka.

Morgan won a bronze medal at the 1995 Pan American Games in the Men's Light Middleweight (-78 kg) event. He competed in the men's half-middleweight event at the 1996 Summer Olympics.

He is the twin brother of Canadian judoka Keith Morgan.

References

External links
 

1973 births
Living people
Canadian male judoka
Olympic judoka of Canada
Judoka at the 1996 Summer Olympics
Sportspeople from Calgary
Pan American Games medalists in judo
Pan American Games bronze medalists for Canada
Judoka at the 1995 Pan American Games
Medalists at the 1995 Pan American Games
20th-century Canadian people
21st-century Canadian people